Nadouonou is a town in the Liptougou Department of Gnagna Province in eastern Burkina Faso. The town has a population of 1,039.

References

Populated places in the Est Region (Burkina Faso)
Gnagna Province